Bayou Caviar is a 2018 American neo-noir drama film directed by Cuba Gooding Jr. and written by Eitan Gorlin and Gooding. The film stars Gooding, Famke Janssen, Richard Dreyfuss, with Gregg Bello, Ken Lerner, Sam Thakur, Katharine McPhee, and Lia Marie Johnson in supporting roles. Russian hockey player Alexei Kovalev makes an appearance in the film. This film marks Gooding's first time as director.

Plot
Rodney (Gooding) is a former boxing star reduced to working as a bouncer, a job that eventually brings him into contact with Yuri (Dreyfuss), a Russian gangster whose preferred method for the disposal of dead bodies is in the form of "bayou caviar," which is food left to the alligators in the Louisiana swamps.

Rodney’s task is to provide compromising evidence on the son-in-law of the gangster’s business associate, a blackmail scheme that if executed properly, could rebound to the benefit of several people, including a fame-hungry teenager Kat (Lia Marie Johnson) and lesbian photographer Nic (Famke Janssen).

Cast
 Cuba Gooding Jr. as Rodney Jones
 Famke Janssen as Nic
 Richard Dreyfuss as Yuri
 Gregg Bello as Isaac
 Ken Lerner as Shlomo
 Sam Thakur as Rafi
 Katharine McPhee as Shelly
 Lia Marie Johnson as Kat
 Kedrick Brown as Emmanuel Johnson
 James Moses Black as Sasha

Filming
Principal photography began on June 19, 2017.

References

External links 

2018 films
2018 drama films
American drama films
2018 directorial debut films
2010s English-language films
2010s American films